Kabaddi was contested at the 2002 Asian Games in Busan, South Korea from October 4 to October 7. The competition took place at the Tongmyong University.

Six teams competed in a round robin competition. In case of tie, the teams classified according to their points difference against the teams which scored more than 25% of the league points.

Schedule

Medalists

Squads

Results
All times are Korea Standard Time (UTC+09:00)

Final standing

References
 Official website

 
2002 Asian Games events
2002
Asian Games
2002 Asian Games